Wang Huijing (born April 19, 1980) is an American table tennis player. She qualified to represent Team USA in the 2020 Tokyo Summer Olympics.

References 

1980 births
Living people
American female table tennis players
Chinese female table tennis players
Olympic table tennis players of the United States
Table tennis players at the 2020 Summer Olympics
Sportspeople from Tianjin
21st-century American women